Timothy Brian Unroe (born October 7, 1970) is an American former professional baseball first baseman.  He is an alumnus of Lewis University.

Career
Drafted by the Milwaukee Brewers in the 28th round of the 1992 Major League Baseball Draft, Unroe made his Major League Baseball (MLB) debut with the Brewers on May 30, 1995, and appeared in his final MLB game on September 30, 2000. In 2001, he played in the Nippon Professional Baseball (NPB) for the Chunichi Dragons. He lives in Mesa, Arizona.

External links

1970 births
Living people
American expatriate baseball players in Canada
American expatriate baseball players in Japan
Anaheim Angels players
Atlanta Braves players
Baseball players from Illinois
Chunichi Dragons players
Edmonton Trappers players
Lewis Flyers baseball players
Major League Baseball first basemen
Milwaukee Brewers players
Nippon Professional Baseball first basemen
Nippon Professional Baseball third basemen
People from Lake County, Illinois
Richmond Braves players
El Paso Diablos players
Helena Brewers players
Iowa Cubs players
New Orleans Zephyrs players
Omaha Golden Spikes players
Stockton Ports players
Tucson Toros players
West Tennessee Diamond Jaxx players